Gagea soleirolii  is a European flowering plant of the lily family. It is native to Spain (including the Balearic Islands), France (including Corsica), Portugal and Sardinia.

References

soleirolii
Flora of Southwestern Europe
Plants described in 1836